The Second Battle of Polotsk (18–20 October 1812) took place during Napoleon's invasion of Russia. In this encounter the Russians under General Peter Wittgenstein attacked and defeated a Franco-Bavarian force under Laurent Gouvion Saint-Cyr. In the aftermath of this success, the Russians took Polotsk and dismantled Napoleon's operations in Belarus. Wittgenstein's victory set the stage for the Battle of Berezina in November, in which three Russian armies converged on Napoleon from separate directions.

Background
While advancing on Moscow, Napoleon left a contingent of French and German troops at Polotsk to guard his northern flank against Wittgenstein.

By establishing a firm front at Polotsk, Napoleon kept Wittgenstein's command at bay. It was critical to French interests that Wittgenstein not be allowed to march south, because such an advance by the Russians would lead to Napoleon's Grande Armée, hundreds of miles to the east, being exposed to an attack in its rear while it was engaging the main Russian army near Moscow. Such a development would sever the Grande Armée's communications with Europe and it would be at risk of being encircled.

Furthermore, the French position at Polotsk was important because it served to protect Vitebsk, which was one of three massive supply depots Napoleon had established in western part of Russian Empire (nowadays Belarus). These three supply depots—the other two being Minsk and Smolensk—were to fuel Napoleon's war effort in the winter should the Grande Armée need to continue the campaign longer than originally anticipated.

Throughout the summer and early fall of 1812, Russians and French were stalemated at Polotsk, which meant that St. Cyr's troops were accomplishing their objective of holding the "Dwina Line". The first battle of Polotsk, an inconclusive engagement fought in August, had the effect of keeping Wittgenstein's army at bay and was therefore considered a success by Napoleon.

By mid-October, however, the strategic balance of power at Polotsk had shifted dramatically. Wittgenstein's force had been massively reinforced and was now numerically superior to the French force it confronted. Wittgestein at this point was in command of close to 50,000 troops. This force was composed of 31,000 regular troops and 9,000 militiamen at Polotsk itself, and a second force of 9,000 troops under General Steingal operating in the rear and flank of Polotsk. Against this Russian juggernaut, the French under St. Cyr had no more than 23,000 to 27,000 troops. On 18 October, Wittgenstein opened his offensive against the French "Dwina Line".

Battle
On the first day of combat, the Russians made seven consecutive frontal assaults on Polotsk, while Steingal's force began advancing on the French rear. The fighting at Polotsk was torrid and bloody, with the Russians losing close 8,000 to 12,000 troops, and the French suffering about 8,000 casualties. All seven Russian attacks were beaten back by the end of the day. St. Cyr could claim to have won round one in this bitter battle, but the affair was not over. Planning to renew his attack once Steingal's forces arrived, Wittgenstein maintained a heavy artillery bombardment of Polotsk, and before long much of the town was consumed by fire.

Late on the next day, 19 October, Steingal advanced to within four miles (6 km) of Polotsk, and St. Cyr realized he was threatened with encirclement. That night, knowing that their position was untenable, the French began evacuating Polotsk. Fierce house-to-house combat ensued in the town as the Russians launched their final attack.

Acting decisively to secure his battered forces' southern retreat route, St. Cyr ordered his Bavarian contingent to drive Steingal back early the following day, 20 October. This task was accomplished by the Bavarians impressively, as Steingal was compelled to retreat with heavy casualties. The French thus saved themselves from encirclement by the Russians, but still, the battle for Polotsk had been lost.

After three days of combat, St. Cyr's forces had been reduced to no more than 15,000 weary troops, in full retreat before Wittgenstein's 38,000 Russians. Two weeks later, Wittgenstein's troops captured the French supply depot at Vitebsk, inflicting a logistical disaster on Napoleon's fast collapsing Russian operation. Napoleon's northern front—the "Dwina Line"—was broken, and the consequences for Napoleon's Russian invasion were grim.

See also
List of battles of the French invasion of Russia

Notes

References

See also

External links
 

Battles of the French invasion of Russia
Battles of the Napoleonic Wars
Battles involving France
Battles involving Russia
Conflicts in 1812
October 1812 events
1812 in the Russian Empire
1812 in Belarus
Polotsk
Military history of Belarus